Conor Masaji Clifford (born December 7, 1993) is an American professional basketball player for Sun Rockers Shibuya in Japan.

Career statistics

|-
| align="left" | 2017–18
| align="left" | Ehime
| 56|| 23|| 11.7|| .609|| .000|| .660|| 3.1|| .2|| .1|| .4|| 7.8
|-
| align="left" | 2018–19
| align="left" | Shimane
| 2|| 1|| 19.15|| .688|| .000|| .750|| 4.0|| 1.0|| .0|| .0|| 12.5
|-

References

External links
Washington State Cougars bio

1993 births
Living people
American expatriate basketball people in Japan
American men's basketball players
American sportspeople of Japanese descent
Basketball players from California
Ehime Orange Vikings players
Saddleback Gauchos men's basketball players
Shimane Susanoo Magic players
Sportspeople from Huntington Beach, California
Sun Rockers Shibuya players
UC Irvine Anteaters men's basketball players
Washington State Cougars men's basketball players